Kamalganj is a town and a nagar panchayat in Farrukhabad district in the Indian state of Uttar Pradesh. The town is one of the key contributors to Potato production in the district. Kamalganj was named after Muslim religion promoter and social worker 'Kamal Baba'.

Geography
It has an average elevation of 135 metres (442 feet).

Demographics
 India census, Kamalganj had a population of 14,659. Males constitute 54% of the population and females 46%. Kamalganj has an average literacy rate of 56%, lower than the national average of 59.5%: male literacy is 62%, and female literacy is 50%. In Kamalganj, 17% of the population is under 6 years of age.

Culture
Being one of the major towns of Farrukhabad, Kamalganj remains to be influenced by district culture. So called 'Farrukhabadi' dialect of Hindi is observable among local people along with Muslim majority speaking Urdu. Festival of colours, Holi is celebrated for eight days in the town, unlike almost all places in India. This whole eight-day celebration is known as 'Holi Milan', locally. Other prominently observed festivals in the town are Diwali and Eid. In last few years, public celebration of Ganesh Chaturthi has also came in light.

Education
Despite being a small town, Kamalganj has few Intermediate and one degree college within town boundaries, helping neighboring rural areas. All intermediate colleges are affiliated by Uttar Pradesh Madhyamik Shiksha Parishad, Allahabad. One degree college, which recently started with post graduate courses in Arts has affiliation with Chhatrapati Shahu Ji Maharaj University, Kanpur, also known as Kanpur University. For post graduation courses in Science and Technology, inhabitants are dependent to major cities nearby, such as Kanpur. Some CBSE affiliated school are also opened.

Transport

Kamalganj has a railway station, situated in the center of town. The station is coded as KLJ under Indian Railway Stations Code dictionary. 4 km away from both sides, its neighboring stations are Yaqutganj and Singhirampur. A broad gauge line connects Kamalganj railway station to Kanpur via Kannauj and to Kasganj via Farrukhabad. One important train that stops over Kamalganj is Kalindi Express. This train establishes a transport link between Kamalganj and capital of India, Delhi.

Kamalganj lies 11 km south of Fatehgarh (a cantonment town in Farrukhabad district) along the road, which connects it to Etah and Kannauj. Inhibited on the banks of River Ganges, important Pilgrimage centers around Kamalganj are Singhirampur and Bhojpur.

References

Cities and towns in Farrukhabad district